Psydrax montana is a species of flowering plant in the family Rubiaceae. It is endemic to Sri Lanka. 
 
The Latin specific epithet montana refers to mountains or coming from mountains.

Culture
Known as "වල් බුරුත - wal burutha (meaning wild satin)" in Sinhala.

References

External links

montana
Flora of Sri Lanka
Vulnerable plants
Taxonomy articles created by Polbot